Some countries have multiple capitals. In some cases, one city is the capital for some purposes, and one or more others are capital for other purposes, without any being considered an official capital in preference to the others.

There are also cases where there is a single legally defined capital, but one or more other cities operate as the seat of government of some or all parts of the national government.

More than one capital at present

More than one capital in the past

These countries have had two cities that served as administrative capitals at the same time, for various reasons such as war, weather or partition. In some cases, the second capital is considered a temporary capital.

See also
 Historical capitals of China
 List of purpose-built national capitals

References

Multiple capitals
Countries with multiple

de:Hauptstadt#Staaten und subnationale Entitäten mit mehreren Hauptstädten